The New York City FC stadium is a proposed soccer-specific stadium to be built in Willets Point in the New York City borough of Queens for New York City FC of Major League Soccer, who currently play home games at Yankee Stadium. The stadium is scheduled to be completed in 2027.

History

Previous proposal sites
Prior to an expansion team being awarded to private ownership in 2011, Major League Soccer (MLS) considered building a stadium in the borough of Manhattan on Pier 40 at the west end of Houston Street adjacent to Hudson River Park. The plan was scrapped due to local opposition.

In 2012, before the club's founding was announced in May 2013, MLS presented initial plans to build a soccer stadium in Flushing Meadows–Corona Park in the borough of Queens. In 2013, Major League Soccer was in negotiations to build a stadium in Flushing Meadows for a future team. The stadium would be located on the site of the Pool of Industry/Fountain of the Planets from the 1964 New York World's Fair. The plan received opposition from community advocacy groups, for converting public park space for a private enterprise, and leasing  of public land for $1 a year for 35 years. Any deal that uses public park land would require a land swap and the creation of a replacement public park. Mayor Michael Bloomberg, who expressed support for the Flushing Meadows site proposed converting the nearby site of the decommissioned Flushing Airport, but that plan too has encountered criticism, as it would not require the club to purchase any land, and would replace a park in a low-income neighborhood with one in a more affluent neighborhood and not accessible by public transit. The New York Mets, the crosstown rivals of New York City FC's minority owner, the New York Yankees, have also expressed their opposition to a new stadium at Flushing Meadows, as the site is within sight of Citi Field, the Mets' home field. The Mets responded with an apparent demand for up to $40 million in compensation for the use of their parking facilities at soccer games should the new stadium be built. The league announced that the club would "continue to review other potential sites".

After the Queens proposal was scrapped, there was a proposal to build the stadium in the borough of the Bronx adjacent to Yankee Stadium. 
The club plans to play at Yankee Stadium for an unspecified number of years. On 29 August 2013, plans for a proposed nine-acre complex near Yankee Stadium, between the Major Deegan Expressway and East 153rd Street, were leaked. Randy Levine, the president of the Yankees, confirmed these reports, but stated that any plans were far from final. In December 2013, the team and Mayor Bloomberg's administration were close to an agreement over a $350 million stadium near Yankee Stadium. Mayor-elect Bill de Blasio, who replaced Bloomberg in January 2014, expressed opposition to the deal, as it involved tax breaks, public financing and a sale or lease of public land, potentially leaving the city responsible for its $240 million debt. In March 2015, New York property lawyer Martin Edelman, a member of Manchester City's board of directors, said that NYCFC had abandoned the Bronx plan and were looking at locations in Queens and Brooklyn to build a new stadium.

In April 2015, NYCFC was reported to be interested in building a new stadium in Columbia University's Baker Athletics Complex in the Inwood neighborhood of Manhattan. The 17,000 seat Robert K. Kraft Field at Lawrence A. Wien Stadium would be demolished and replaced with a $400 million 25,000-seat stadium to be used by NYCFC and the Columbia Lions. As of October 2016 the pursuit of the Baker Athletics Complex as a potential stadium site was abandoned.

In February 2017, it was reported that New York City FC had expressed interest in having its own soccer-specific stadium at a site within Belmont Park in Elmont, New York just outside the city limits in Nassau County. The club participated in site development talks in January 2017, though they did not enter active negotiations.  On December 19, 2017, the site was selected as the new home for the New York Islanders' 18,000-seat arena, effectively ending the plans to build the stadium.

In April 2018, new plans for the Harlem River Yards development in the South Bronx were revealed, for the land north of the Willis Avenue Bridge; the area would be anchored by the new 26,000-seat stadium, which would be designed by Rafael Viñoly. On April 25, 2018, club president Jon Patricof said that the club was focusing on other sites more seriously than Harlem Yards.

In July 2018, New York City FC was again linked to a development project that would put a stadium in the South Bronx at East 153 Street between Yankee Stadium and the Bronx Terminal Market. The  proposal also included a "park, hotel and conference center, affordable apartment units, office space, a school, and retail." On October 24, 2021, The City reported that stadium negotiations between the Yankees and the New York City Economic Development Corporation collapsed due to a dispute over 5,000 parking spaces in a city-owned garage, with community support waning as well. In a November, club CEO Brad Sims stated the project did not progress throughout the summer and is not actively pursuing the site; with all the focus now being shifted to the Queens project.

Willets Point site 
On January 17, 2019, the New York City Mayor's office released two development proposals for Willets Point, an industrial neighborhood in Queens. One of the said proposals "calls for a soccer stadium of up to 25,000 seats." Located just east of Citi Field and north of Flushing Meadows-Corona Park, the soccer specific venue would share parking with the existing baseball stadium. While the proposal never mentioned New York City FC by name, speculation linked the site and the club as The Related Companies, the developers behind the proposed Harlem River Yards plan, are also spearheading this development. Queensboro FC had been linked to the site initially, but has since been confirmed to play in a new stadium at York College.

In July 2022, the New York Post reported that mayor Eric Adams would approve a plan to build a stadium in Willets Point by 2025 and to be completed in time for the 2026 FIFA World Cup, albeit it still had to go through the City's Uniform Land Use Review Procedure (ULURP). That November, the government of New York City and NYCFC came to an agreement to build a 25,000 seat stadium in Willets Point that is expected to be completed in 2027. The stadium would be part of a larger mixed-use development with a 250-room hotel and 2,500 housing units on a  lot.

References

External links
Official site

New York City FC
Major League Soccer stadiums
Flushing, Queens
Flushing Meadows–Corona Park
Soccer venues in New York City
Proposed stadiums in the United States
Proposed buildings and structures in New York City
Sports venues in Queens, New York